BlackBoxTV is a commercial YouTube channel and production studio founded by director Tony E. Valenzuela. It was launched on August 17, 2010 and relaunched on April 13, 2012 as part of YouTube's $150 million original channel initiative. The channel, which has collaborated with Wes Craven, Guillermo del Toro and Anthony E. Zuiker, is home to BlackBoxTV Presents, which Variety called "the longest-running scripted drama online" in March 2016.

History
The channel originally launched in August 2010 with one scripted series - BlackBoxTV Presents, a horror anthology featuring a cast of YouTube creators including Philip DeFranco, Justine Ezarik and Shane Dawson.

In October 2011, it was announced that BlackBoxTV was among 100 entities YouTube had partnered with as part of a $150 million investment in television-style  programming. The channel relaunched on April 13, 2012, with four new series: Silverwood, Black Friday, True Stories and Anthony E. Zuiker Presents, produced in collaboration with CSI creator Anthony E. Zuiker and Collective Digital Studio.

In 2014, Legendary Entertainment partnered with the channel to produce Versions of Elloise for the “YouTube Space House of Horrors: A Legendary Halloween short film contest.” The film was selected among ten finalists by  Guillermo del Toro.  Also in 2014, Alpine Labs (formerly Ketchum Labs) partnered with BlackBoxTV to distribute the reality competition series Fight of the Living Dead.

Programming

360/Virtual Reality
In October, 2015 the channel launched BlackBoxTV Presents: Horror | 360, a virtual reality series for mobile devices and VR headsets. The 11-episode first season included collaborations with Warner Bros. and New Line Cinema. On September 26, 2017 the series won "Best Immersive Series" for excellence in 360 and VR filmmaking at the 2017 Streamy Awards. In September, 2016 Collab announced it had signed a deal with BlackBoxTV to represent the channel and fund two 360 video projects. In 2017, the channel debuted Find Me, a scripted virtual reality series, mobile app and game produced in partnership with Collab and the Los Angeles Times.

Audio Series 
In 2018, Serial Box acquired the rights to produce Silverwood: The Door, a scripted audio series and eBook that will expand the BlackBoxTV: Silverwood universe.

References

External links

 
 

Webcasters
YouTube channels
YouTube channels launched in 2010
YouTube-funded channels
2010 establishments in California
English-language YouTube channels
Internet properties established in 2010
Mass media companies established in 2010
Streamy Award-winning channels, series or shows